William Kaye (1813–1890) was Mayor of Louisville, Kentucky.

William Kaye may also refer to:
William Kaye (Australian politician) (c. 1820–1893)
William Kaye (judge) (1919–2012), Australian judge
William Kaye (priest) (1822–1913), Archdeacon of Lincoln in the Church of England

See also
William Kay (disambiguation)